Singleton Nunatak is a nunatak located directly west of the head of Kauffman Glacier on the east side of Palmer Land. Named by United Kingdom Antarctic Place-Names Committee (UK-APC) after David G. Singleton, British Antarctic Survey (BAS) geologist who worked in the general vicinity of this feature.

Nunataks of Palmer Land